Temidayo Abudu is a Nigerian film producer, copywriter, and casting director. She is best known for producing the crime drama film titled Òlòtūré, and co-producing Chief Daddy with Mo Abudu.

Education
Temidayo Abudu holds a bachelor's degree in Management and Marketing from Royal Holloway, University of London.

Filmography
Òlòtūré (2019)
Chief Daddy (2018)
The Royal Hibiscus Hotel (2017)

Personal life
In 2019, Temidayo married Adebola Makanjuola in California, United States. They both welcomed their first son in 2020.

See also
List of Yoruba people
List of Nigerian film producers

References

External links

Living people
Year of birth missing (living people)
Yoruba women filmmakers
Nigerian women film producers
Nigerian film producers
People associated with Royal Holloway, University of London
Alumni of Royal Holloway, University of London
Casting directors
Women casting directors
Copywriters